The Keith Harris Show was a comedy variety show on BBC TV featuring Keith Harris and Orville the Duck.

Series overview
 New Year Special: 31 December 1982
 Series 1:  14 May - 18 June 1983  6 epsoides:
 Bank Holiday Special 28 May 1984 
 Series 2: 11 May - 8 June  1985  6 epsoides: 
 Series 3: 10 May - 14 June 1986   6 epsoides:

References

External links
IMDb

1982 British television series debuts
1986 British television series endings
1980s British comedy television series
BBC Television shows
British variety television shows
British television shows featuring puppetry